Janice M. Holder (born August 29, 1949) is an American judge who was a Tennessee Supreme Court justice from 1996–2014 and was Chief Justice of Tennessee from 2008 to 2010. She is the first woman ever to hold the chief justice position, and was succeeded in 2010 by another woman (Cornelia A. Clark).

Education
Holder, a native of McDonald, Pennsylvania, attended Allegheny College from 1967-1968.  She received a Bachelor of Science degree summa cum laude from the University of Pittsburgh in 1971.  In 1975 she was awarded the Doctor of Jurisprudence degree from the law school of Duquesne University; during her final year there she served as Recent Decisions Editor of the law review.

Early legal career
After law school, Holder served as a clerk for the Honorable Herbert P. Sorg, then Chief Judge of the federal court for the Western District of Pennsylvania. She engaged in the private practice of law from 1977 to 1990, moving during this time to Memphis, Tennessee. While in Memphis she served as editor of the Memphis Bar Forum, 1987–1991; chair of the Tennessee Bar Association Commission on Women and Minorities, 1994–1996, trustee of the Tennessee Bar Foundation, 1995–1999 and its secretary from 1996–1999, and Master of the Bench of the Leo Bearman, Sr. American Inn of Court, 1995–1997, and was the recipient of numerous professional awards. She is also a founding member of the Tennessee Lawyers' Association for Women.

Judicial career
In 1990, Holder was elected to the position of Circuit Court Judge, Division II, Thirtieth Judicial District.  This district consists of Shelby County, Tennessee, and Division II deals primarily with civil cases.  In 1996 she was one of three nominees for a vacancy on the Tennessee Supreme Court submitted to then-Governor of Tennessee Don Sundquist under the Tennessee Plan; she was the person subsequently selected by him, and her service on the Supreme Court began in December 1996.  In August 1998, having been recommended for retention under the process outlined in the Tennessee Plan, she was approved by the voters of the state for a full eight-year term.  In August 2006, having again been recommended for another eight-year term, she was again approved by the voters with a majority exceeding 75% and receiving a majority of affirmative votes in each of the state's 95 counties. On June 26, 2013 Holder announced that she would not seek retention in August 2014 and would retire when her term ended.

See also
List of female state supreme court justices

References

Tennessee Blue Book, 2005-2006 edition, p 286

1949 births
Living people
Tennessee lawyers
Duquesne University alumni
University of Pittsburgh alumni
American women judges
Women in Tennessee politics
Chief Justices of the Tennessee Supreme Court
Women chief justices of state supreme courts in the United States
Allegheny College alumni
People from McDonald, Pennsylvania
21st-century American women
20th-century American women judges
20th-century American judges
21st-century American women judges
21st-century American judges